Daniel H. Rubinstein (born 1967) is a United States Foreign Service Officer and diplomat. He has served as consul general, the top U.S. official at the Jerusalem consulate and directed the State Department's Office of Israel and Palestinian Affairs. From October 2015 to January 2019, Rubinstein served as United States Ambassador to Tunisia; he was succeeded by Donald A. Blome.

Career
Rubinstein is a graduate of the University of California at Berkeley. A career member of the Senior Foreign Service, Rubinstein also served as Consul General and Chief of Mission in Jerusalem from 2009 to 2012, Deputy Chief of Mission at the U.S. Embassy in Amman,  Jordan from 2005 to 2008, and as Chief of the Civilian Observer Unit in the Multinational Force and Observers in Sinai, Egypt. Earlier, he served as Director of the Office of Israel and  Palestinian Affairs in the Department of State from 2004 to 2005. Rubinstein speaks Arabic, Hebrew, and Portuguese.

Rubinstein, one of the State Department's leading “Arabists,” replaced Ambassador Robert Ford as the US Special Envoy to Syria.

In March 2014, U.S. Secretary of State John Kerry announced that Rubinstein would replace Robert Stephen Ford as the United States Special Envoy for Syria. Rubinstein thus served as Ambassador from October 2015 to January 2019, after which he retired from the State Department.

Daniel Rubinstein appointed as Charge d'Affaires ad interim at the US Embassy in Cairo on August 23, 2022.

References 

|-

|-

1967 births
Living people
Ambassadors of the United States to Tunisia
20th-century American Jews
United States Special Envoys
University of California, Berkeley alumni
Place of birth missing (living people)
United States Foreign Service personnel
21st-century American Jews
21st-century American diplomats